Ephydrinae is a subfamily of shore flies in the family Ephydridae.

Genera
Tribe Ephydrini Zetterstedt, 1837
Austrocoenia Wirth, 1970
Cirrula Cresson, 1915
Dimecoenia Cresson, 1916
Ephydra Fallén, 1810
Neoephydra Mathis 2008
Notiocoenia Mathis, 1980
Paraephydra Mathis 2008
Setacera Cresson, 1930
Tribe Scatellini Wirth & Stone, 1956
Brachydeutera Loew, 1860
Coenia Robineau-Desvoidy, 1830
Apulvillus Malloch, 1935
Haloscatella Mathis, 1979
Lamproscatella Hendel, 1917
Limnellia Malloch, 1925
Philotelma Becker, 1896
Paracoenia Cresson, 1935
Scatella Robineau-Desvoidy, 1830
Neoscatella Malloch, 1933
Scatella Robineau-Desvoidy, 1830
Scatophila Becker, 1896
Teichomyza Macquart, 1835
Tribe Parydrini Wirth & Stone, 1956
Parydra Stenhammer, 1844
Eutaenionotum Oldenberg, 1923
Tribe Dagini Mathis, 1982
Diedrops Mathis & Wirth, 1976
Physemops Cresson, 1934
Dagus Cresson, 1935
Psilephydra Hendel, 1914

unplaced
Calocoenia

References

Ephydridae
Brachycera subfamilies